Buggy is a racing game developed and published by Gremlin Interactive in 1998, and published in North America by Fox Interactive. The game was released in North America as Team Losi RC Racer due to it having a license from RC car manufacturer/racing team Team Losi.

Reception

The PlayStation version received mixed reviews according to the review aggregation website GameRankings. Next Generation said, "Simply put, there isn't a single positive thing to say about Team Losi. It's about as much fun as Gremlin's last PlayStation game (Judge Dredd), and that about says it all."

Notes

References

External links
 

1998 video games
Fox Interactive games
Gremlin Interactive games
PlayStation (console) games
Racing video games
Windows games